The Voivode of Vilnius was a high-ranking officer in the Grand Duchy of Lithuania who governed the Vilnius Voivodeship from 1413. He was considered as the most influential member of the Lithuanian Council of Lords. After the Union of Lublin in 1569, the Voivodes of Vilnius (who were senators of the Polish–Lithuanian Commonwealth) were ranked as the fourth highest, while the Castellans of Vilnius were ranked as the sixth highest officers among the Voivodeships of the Polish–Lithuanian Commonwealth. After the Third Partition of the Commonwealth, the Vilnius Voivodeship was annexed by the Russian Empire and this position was annulled.

Elders of Vilnius

Voivodes of Vilnius

References

 
Vilnius Voivodeship
Grand Duchy of Lithuania
Polish–Lithuanian Commonwealth